Jamie Caliri (born February 22, 1970 in Buffalo, New York) is an American director, known primarily for music videos, television commercials and title sequences.

Between 1988 and 1992, he studied film, design, and animation at the California Institute of the Arts. He is also a self-taught still photographer.

He has been signed to production companies Acme Filmworks (ca. 1992–ca. 1994), Duck Soup Studios (1994–1995) and its division The Front (1995–1997), MJZ and its satellite Stimmung (1997–ca. 1999), and to Windmill Lane and its subsidiary Pusher (2003–ca. 2005).

He has directed commercials for Children's Medical Center (Dallas) (2010), Fruitopia (1997), KCRW (1996), Pier 1 Imports, and United Airlines (2006 and 2008), among others.

In 2006, he was asked to explore animation concepts for a feature film adaptation of The Amazing Adventures of Kavalier & Clay. The project fell through, but Caliri posted two and a half minutes of concept footage he directed, titled The Escapist v.s. The Iron Gauntlet, on his Vimeo channel.

As a still photographer, he has worked for clients such as Capitol Records, Interscope Records and Helios Dance Theater.

In addition to this, he also DPed a number of short films, music videos and commercials and taught experimental animation at CalArts.

His brother is drummer Mario Calire.

Jamie and his youngest brother Dyami legally changed the spelling of their last names from "Calire" to "Caliri" to reflect the original Italian spelling.

Since 1993, he and his software engineer brother Dyami Caliri have collaborated to create stop motion animation software. In 2005, they developed Dragonframe.

Notable works

Music videos
 Soul Coughing, "Super Bon Bon", released December 1996
 Morphine, "Early to Bed", March 1997, nominated for a Grammy Award for Best Short Form Music Video in 1998
 Cypress Hill, "Boom Biddy Bye Bye (Fugees Remix)", August 1996, co-directed by Dante Ariola
 Marcy Playground, "Sex and Candy", October 1997
 Eels, "Your Lucky Day in Hell", December 1997
 Black Lab, "Time Ago", May 1998
 Cherry Poppin' Daddies, "Brown Derby Jump", July 1998
 Marcy Playground, "Comin' Up from Behind", March 1999
 The Shins, "The Rifle's Spiral", April 2012, co-directed by Alexander Juhasz

Title sequences
 Big Apple, 2001, opening credits
 Lemony Snicket's A Series of Unfortunate Events, 2004, end titles
 Madagascar: Escape 2 Africa, 2008, end titles
 United States of Tara, 2009, opening credits, won the Primetime Emmy Award for Outstanding Main Title Design in 2009

Short films
 The Escapist v.s. The Iron Gauntlet, 2006
 The Sun and the Seed, 2008

Album art
 Cypress Hill, Cypress Hill III: Temples of Boom, 1995, photography
 Marcy Playground, Shapeshifter, 1999, photography
 The Wallflowers, Red Letter Days, 2002, art direction / packaging / photography

References

External links
 
 Showreel at Duck Studios
 

American music video directors
Living people
1970 births